Sandling is a suburb to the north of the town of Maidstone, Kent, England. It is within the parish of Boxley. 

Within the area is the headquarters of the Kent Wildlife Trust at Tyland Barn. Sandling is also home to the Museum of Kent Life.

Maidstone